John Salmond Barron (17 February 1879 – 24 July 1908) was a Scottish professional footballer who played in the Scottish League for Dundee as an inside right. He also played in the Southern League for Brentford.

Personal life 
Barron emigrated to the United States in September 1905 and died of electrocution while working on overhead wires in Westfield, New Jersey in 1908. He was buried in Rahway Public Cemetery.

Career statistics

References

1879 births
1908 deaths
Scottish footballers
Footballers from Aberdeen
Association football inside forwards
Brentford F.C. players
Dundee F.C. players
Scottish Football League players
Southern Football League players
Aberdeen F.C. players
Scottish emigrants to the United States
Accidental deaths by electrocution
Orion F.C. players